Kloster Tempzin is a municipality in the Ludwigslust-Parchim district, in Mecklenburg-Vorpommern, Germany. It was created on 1 January 2016 by the merger of the former municipalities Langen Jarchow and Zahrensdorf. It takes its name from the former Tempzin monastery.

References

External links 
 

Ludwigslust-Parchim